Jordan Scott (born May 8, 1978) is a Canadian poet, who won the Latner Writers' Trust Poetry Prize in 2018.

Scott's first book of poetry, Silt, was published in 2005, and was shortlisted for the Dorothy Livesay Poetry Prize in 2006. He followed up in 2008 with Blert, a collection of poetry inspired by his lifelong struggle with stuttering.

In 2013, Scott and Stephen Collis collaborated on Decomp, a book which combined prose poetry with photography. In 2015 he was granted access to the Guantanamo Bay detention camp, spending five days exploring the facility and publishing the multimedia work Clearance Process in 2016 to document his visit.

His 2020 children's book, I Talk Like a River, was named as Best Children's Book of the Year Award for 2020 by Publishers Weekly, and was a finalist for the Christie Harris Illustrated Children's Literature Prize.

Works
Silt (2005)
Blert (2008)
Decomp (2013)
Clearance Process (2016)
Night & Ox (2017)
I Talk Like a River (2020)
 German: Ich bin wie der Fluss (2021)

References

1978 births
21st-century Canadian poets
21st-century Canadian male writers
Canadian male poets
Writers from British Columbia
Living people
Canadian children's writers